Events in the year 1907 in Spain.

Incumbents
Monarch: Alfonso XIII
President of the Government: Antonio Aguilar Correa (until 25 January), Antonio Maura Montaner (starting 25 January)

Births

February 21 - José González, sport shooter
March 18 - Luis Gabriel Portillo, aristocrat (d. 1993)

Deaths

Emilio Sánchez Perrier, painter (b. 1855)

References

 
Years of the 20th century in Spain
1900s in Spain
Spain
Spain